2016 Champions League may refer to:

Football
2015–16 UEFA Champions League
2016–17 UEFA Champions League
2016 AFC Champions League
2016 CAF Champions League
2016 GCC Champions League